This is a list of Danish television related events from 2010.

Events
6 February - Chanée & N'evergreen are selected to represent Denmark at the 2010 Eurovision Song Contest with their song "In a Moment Like This". They are selected to be the thirty-eighth Danish Eurovision entry during Dansk Melodi Grand Prix held at the Gigantium in Aalborg.
27 March - Thomas Ring wins the third season of X Factor.
22 October - Copenhagen Drummers win the third and final season of Talent.
19 November - TV2 weathergirl Cecile Hother and her partner Mads Vad win the seventh season of Vild med dans.

Debuts

Television shows

1990s
Hvem vil være millionær? (1999–present)

2000s
Vild med dans (2005–present)
X Factor (2008–present)

Ending this year
Talent (2008-2010)

Births

Deaths

See also
 2010 in Denmark